The women's duet artistic swimming competition at the 2006 Asian Games in Doha was held on 9 December at the Hamad Aquatic Centre.

Schedule
All times are Arabia Standard Time (UTC+03:00)

Results 
Legend
FR — Reserve in free
RR — Reserve in technical and free
TR — Reserve in technical

References 

Official Website

Artistic swimming at the 2006 Asian Games